The 2018–19 season was Charlton Athletic's 113th season in their existence. Along with competing in the League One, the club also participated in the FA Cup, EFL Cup and EFL Trophy. The season covered the period from 1 July 2018 to 30 June 2019.

Squad statistics

|}

Top scorers

Disciplinary record

Transfers

Transfers in

Transfers out

Loans in

Loans out

Competitions

Friendlies
On 22 May 2018, Charlton Athletic announced its first confirmed friendly taking place ahead of the 2018–19 season would be against Welling United at Park View Road. On 29 May the first home friendly was announced which would see Brighton & Hove Albion visit The Valley on 24 July 2018. A further home friendly was added against Norwich City for 28 July 2018. On 27 June 2018 it was announced that a behind-closed door friendly between Queens Park Rangers and Charlton Athletic would take place on 7 July at QPR's Harlington training ground.

League One

League table

Result summary

Results by round

Matches

League One play-offs

FA Cup

The first round draw was made live on BBC by Dennis Wise and Dion Dublin on 22 October. The draw for the second round was made live on BBC and BT by Mark Schwarzer and Glenn Murray on 12 November.

EFL Cup

On 15 June 2018, Charlton Athletic were drawn away to Milton Keynes Dons in the first round.

EFL Trophy

On 13 July 2018, the initial group stage draw bar the U21 invited clubs was announced.

Kent Senior Cup

References

Charlton Athletic
Charlton Athletic F.C. seasons
Charlton